Harich is a village in De Fryske Marren municipality in the province of Friesland, the Netherlands. It had a population of around 470 in 2017.

History
The village was first mentioned in 1245 as Harich, and means holy place. Harich developed on a sandy ridge around the church. The tower of the Protestant church probably dates from the 12th century. The church itself was rebuilt in 1663 after a storm. In 1840, it was home to 279 people. In 1942, the forced labour camp Wyldemerk Harich was opened in the forests near Harich.

Before 2014, Harich was part of the Gaasterlân-Sleat municipality and before 1984 it belonged to Gaasterland.

Gallery

References

External links

De Fryske Marren
Populated places in Friesland